= Phoxocephalopsidae =

Scientific classification
- Kingdom: Animalia
- Phylum: Arthropoda
- Clade: Pancrustacea
- Class: Malacostraca
- Order: Amphipoda
- Superfamily: Haustorioidea
- Family: Phoxocephalopsidae

Family of crustaceans

Phoxocephalopsidae is a family of crustaceans belonging to the order Amphipoda.

Genera:

- Eophoxocephalopsis Thurston, 1989
- Phoxocephalopsis Schellenberg, 1931
- Pseudurothoe Ledoyer, 1986
- Puelche Barnard & Clark, 1982
- Urothopsis Ledoyer, 1967
